The men's cross-country cycling event at the 2015 European Games in Baku took place at Mountain Bike Velopark on 13 June.

Result

External links
 
 

Men's cross country
2015 in mountain biking